is a Japanese corporation founded in 1873. Its main areas of business are building construction, civil engineering, and real estate development. Taisei's headquarters are located at Shinjuku Center Building in Nishi-Shinjuku, Shinjuku, Tokyo.

Taisei has 15 branch offices, 1 technology center, 46 domestic offices, 12 overseas offices, 29 consolidated subsidiaries and 43 affiliated companies accounted for by the equity-method.

Overview
Taisei Corporation is one of the five so called Japanese , the other four being Kajima Corporation, Shimizu Corporation, Takenaka Corporation and Obayashi Corporation. Taisei Corporation has its roots in Okura  established by Baron Ōkura Kihachirō (大倉 喜八郎). Following the dissolution of the zaibatsu after World War II, Taisei was restructured as an employee-owned corporation and is currently the only employee-owned Japanese large scale general contractor among the "super general contractors"; the other four are owned and controlled by families.

Taisei has successfully constructed several civil and building projects including skyscrapers, dams, bridges, tunnels, subways as well as residential housing projects both in Japan and overseas. Taisei is also well known in Japan for its disaster resistant housing brand .

Noted international projects where Taisei was involved include the expansion of the Palm Islands undersea tunnel in Dubai, the Bosphorus undersea tunnel in Turkey, the New Doha International Airport in Qatar, the Noi Bai International Airport Terminal 2 in Hanoi, the Mega Bridge in Thailand, the Cần Thơ Bridge in Vietnam and the Iloilo International Airport in Iloilo City, Philippines.

History

It became  in 1887, and was renamed Taisei Corporation in 1946.

 1873 October - Okura Kihachiro founded Okuragumi Shokai.
 1887 March -  Nippon Doboku Co., Ltd. was established as a limited liability company.
 1946 January - Renamed to Taisei Corporation.

Achievements
The following are some notable achievements of Taisei since its establishment in 1873.

 1882 - Ginza Arc Lights: The first electrical street lighting in Japan was installed on Ginza Dori shopping street in Tokyo
 1882 - Rokumeikan, a beautiful western-style building was constructed
 1890 - Lake Biwa Lock and Tunnel: A modern development project in Kyoto to use the water of Lake Biwa in a canal and for power generation
 1923 - New Imperial Hotel: The first real Western style hotel in Japan, designed by Frank Lloyd Wright, was constructed.
 1927 - Tokyo's Ginza Subway Line, Japan's first subway connecting Ueno to Asakusa was constructed.
 1955 - The terminal building at Tokyo International Airport (Haneda) was constructed
 1958 - National Stadium, the first major athletic stadium in Japan was constructed for the third Asian Games. After modification in 1963, it was used as the main stadium of the Tokyo Olympics
 1964 - Hotel New Otani, Japan's first skyscraper constructed in time to accommodate visitors to the 1964 Tokyo Olympics.
 1965 - Mt. Fuji Weather Station, one of Japan's main meteorological observing stations. It was constructed under harsh weather conditions at the highest altitude in Japan.
 1968 - Completion of the new Imperial Palace.
 1988 - Seikan Tunnel is Japan's longest railway tunnel connecting Hakodate to Aomori by land. It took over 20 years to complete.
 1989 - Completion of the Yokohama Bay Bridge.
 1991 - Tokyo Metropolitan Government Main Building No. 1, a symbolic building towering over the new city center of Tokyo.
 1994 - Kannongawa River water-conveyance conduit (Original client: Kawasaki City, Client: Japan Sewage Works Agency), for which the spherical shield production process (horn industrial method) was adopted for the first time in the world.
 2001 - Sapporo Dome is a large dome constructed for the 2002 World Cup. With its hovering sliding pitch stage, the dome can host indoor football and baseball games.
 2009 - Djibouti Kempinski Hotel, a high-class five-star hotel was designed and constructed in just nine months.
 2010 - Tokyo International Airport (Haneda) Runway D adopted the world's first hybrid structure that combines a reclaimed land portion with a jetty portion.
 2012 - JP Tower is a seismic isolated building that preserves part of the old Tokyo Station Central Post Office on a block that faces Tokyo Station Plaza
 2013 - Opening of the Bosphorus undersea tunnel, Istanbul, Turkey. The undersea tunnel was constructed by the immersed tunnel method to form the world's deepest immersed tunnel, in one of the most rapid ocean currents in the world.
 2014 - Completed construction of the Noi Bai International Airport Terminal, Hanoi, Vietnam
 2016 - Sumitomo Fudosan Roppongi Grand Tower. Completed a high-rise building of about 230 meters tall, housing three functions of commercial office space, residential space, and retail space, in an extensive area of about 27,000 square meters that is adjacent to Roppongi-itchome Station on the Tokyo Metro Namboku Line.

Domestic Operations

Headquarters
Taisei's headquarters is located in Shinjuku Center Building, Nishi-Shinjuku, Shinjuku, Tokyo. Taisei has 15 branch offices, 1 technology center, 46 domestic offices and 6 major domestic subsidiaries.

Domestic Offices
 Kyushu: Fukuoka
 Chugoku: Hiroshima
 Shikoku: Takamatsu
 Kansai: Osaka
 Kobe
 Kyoto
 Nagoya
 Yokohama
 Chiba
 Kanto: Saitama
 Tokyo
 Hokushinetsu: Niigata
 Tohoku: Sendai
 Sapporo

Domestic Subsidiaries
 Taisei ROTEC Corporation
 Taisei-Yuraku Real Estate Co., Ltd.
 Taisei U-LEC Co., Ltd.
 Taisei Setsubi Co., Ltd.
 Taisei Housing Corporation
 Seiwa Renewal Works Co., Ltd.

International Operations

Headquarters
Taisei's international operations headquarters is located in Shinjuku Center Building, Nishi-Shinjuku, Shinjuku, Tokyo.

Overseas Offices

Taiwan
 Taipei

Qatar
 Doha

Malaysia
 Kuala Lumpur

Indonesia
 Jakarta

India
 Delhi

Pakistan
 Islamabad

Vietnam
 Hanoi
 Ho Chi Minh City

Thailand
 Bangkok

Philippines
 Manila

Myanmar
 Yangon

Sri Lanka
 Colombo

Egypt
 Cairo

Turkey
 Istanbul

Subsidiaries and Affiliates

Indonesia
 PT. Taisei Pulauintan Construction International
PT. Indotaisei Indah Development

Thailand
 Taisei (Thailand) Co., Ltd.

Vietnam
 Vinata International Co., Ltd.

China
 CSCEC-Taisei Construction, Ltd.

Philippines
 Taisei Philippine Construction, Inc.

Myanmar

 Taisei Myanmar Co., Ltd.

Photos

References

External links

 Taisei Corporation
 Taisei Corporation 
 Palcon Housing

Engineering companies of Japan
Construction and civil engineering companies of Japan
Companies based in Tokyo
Construction and civil engineering companies based in Tokyo
Real estate companies based in Tokyo
Japanese brands
Japanese companies established in 1873
Companies listed on the Tokyo Stock Exchange
Fuyo Group
Construction and civil engineering companies established in 1873